Zizi Papacharissi is a Greek-American writer and communications researcher. She is professor and head of the department of communication at the University of Illinois at Chicago and editor of the journals Journal of Broadcasting & Electronic Media and Social Media and Society.

Biography 
Papacharissi was born and raised in Thessaloniki and graduated from Anatolia College in 1991. She earned a double BA in Economics and Media Studies from Mount Holyoke College in 1995, an MA in Communication Studies from to Kent State University in 1997, and a Ph.D. in New Media and Political Communication from the University of Texas at Austin in 2000.

Research 
Papacharissi's work focuses on the social and political consequences of new media technologies. She has published four books and over 50 articles. In A Private Sphere (Polity 2010), she argued that digital technologies are changing the site of civic engagement to the private realm. She further develops this thesis in her book Affective Publics: Sentiment, Technology and Politics (Oxford University 2014), arguing that social movements sustained by digital media should not be defined by their political efficacy but rather by their affective intensities or how they help publics "feel their way into" an event or issue. Affective Publics won Best Book award for the Human Communication and Technology Division of the National Communication Association in 2015 and was praised by critics. Lilie Chouliaraki wrote that Affective Publics is "a significant statement in its own right about the ontology of digital communication...introduced in the field by this groundbreaking work."  

She has also edited Routledge collections, A Networked Self and Birth, Life, Death: Routledge (2019), A Networked Self and Platforms, Stories, Connections: Routledge (2018), Identity, Community and Culture on Social Network Sites and Journalism and Citizenship: New Agendas (Routledge, 2009).

Papacharissi was a consultant for Apple, Microsoft, and the Obama 2012 election campaign. She sits on the Committee on the Health and Well-Being of Young Adults, funded by the National Academies of Science, the National Research Council, and the Institute of Medicine.

Select publications

 Papacharissi, Z. (2015). Affective Publics and Structure of Storytelling: Sentiment, Events and Mediality. Information, Communication and Society, 19 (3), 307-324.
 Papacharissi, Z. (2014). Toward New Journalism(s): Affective News, Hybridity, and Liminal Spaces. Journalism Studies, published online March 2014.
 Papacharissi, Z. (2015). The unbearable lightness of information and the impossible gravitas of knowledge: Big Data and the makings of a Digital Orality. 'Debating Big Data' in Media, Culture and Society, 37 (7).
 Papacharissi, Z., Streeter, T., Gillespie, T. (2013). Culture Digitally: Habitus of the New. Journal of Broadcasting and Electronic Media, 57 (4), 596-607.

References

External links 
 

Living people
Greek academics
University of Illinois Chicago faculty
Greek emigrants to the United States
Moody College of Communication alumni
Year of birth missing (living people)
Mount Holyoke College alumni
Kent State University alumni
21st-century Greek women writers
21st-century American women writers
People from Thessaloniki